Planetarian: The Reverie of a Little Planet is a visual novel developed by Key and published by VisualArt's and KineticNovel in 2004. The story centers around a middle-aged man who comes across a malfunctioning robot in a dead city. The man, known simply as "the junker", stays with this robot for a time and attempts to fix the projector of the planetarium where the story takes place. It was adapted by David Production into an original net animation (OVA) series and an animated film titled Planetarian: Storyteller of the Stars in 2016. An OVA titled Planetarian: Snow Globe animated by Okuruto Noboru was produced in 2021, and Key also released a visual novel version of Snow Globe in 2021. The core of the discography is the original soundtrack album produced by Key Sounds Label in 2006 for the visual novel. The music on the soundtrack was mainly composed and arranged by Magome Togoshi. A second soundtrack and two singles for the anime adaptations by David Production were released in 2016. An EP for Planetarian was released in 2017 featuring music from the visual novel and anime adaptations by David Production. A soundtrack for the Snow Globe OVA and visual novel was released in 2021.

Albums

Planetarian Original Soundtrack
The Planetarian Original Soundtrack, from the visual novel Planetarian: The Reverie of a Little Planet, was released on August 11, 2006, at Comiket 70 by Key Sounds Label bearing the catalog number KSLA-0025; it was later re-released on December 28, 2006. The soundtrack contains one disc totaling twelve songs composed, arranged, and produced by Magome Togoshi, and Shinji Orito; themes originally composed by Charles Crozat Converse and Kenji Miyazawa were remixed on the soundtrack. Aside from the songs in the game like "Gentle Jena" and "Hoshi no Sekai (Opening)", the soundtrack includes new songs such as an arranged vocal version of "Hoshi Meguri no Uta", sung by Mell. The musical tracks played at the beginning and the end of the game (tracks one and eight in the original soundtrack) are rearrangements of the hymn "What a Friend We Have in Jesus" by Charles Crozat Converse, and their titles reflect this as well: "Hoshi no Sekai (Opening)" refers to the Japanese version of the hymn, named "Hoshi no Yo", and "Itsukushimi Fukaki" is the Japanese translation of the hymn's original title.

All songs arranged by Magome Togoshi, except where noted.

Planetarian Original Soundtrack
Planetarian Original Soundtrack is a soundtrack containing music tracks featured in the Planetarian original net animation series and the film Planetarian: Storyteller of the Stars by David Production. It was released on October 26, 2016, in Japan by Key Sounds Label bearing the catalog numbers KSLA-0122–0123. The soundtrack is composed, arranged, and produced by Shinji Orito, Magome Togoshi, Donmaru, Tomohiro Takeshita, Ryō Mizutsuki and Shōji Morifuji.

Planetarian Analog Collector's Edition
Planetarian Analog Collector's Edition is an EP to be released on a gramophone record for the Planetarian visual novel and anime adaptations. A crowdfunding campaign for the record ran from May 22 to June 25, 2017, and it reached its goal of ¥1 million in under 12 hours. The campaign ultimately raised ¥3,393,500. It was released in September 2017 by Key Sounds Label bearing the catalog number KSLA-0142. The EP features music previously released for Planetarian, but also includes a new remix of "Twinkle Starlight". The EP is composed, arranged, and produced by Shinji Orito, Magome Togoshi, Donmaru, Tomohiro Takeshita, Shōji Morifuji and Takayuki Negishi. The vocal pieces are sung by Mell, Lia, Sayaka Sasaki and Ceui.

Planetarian: Snow Globe Original Sound Tracks & Voice Drama CD
Planetarian: Snow Globe Original Sound Tracks & Voice Drama CD s a soundtrack containing music tracks featured in the Planetarian: Snow Globe original video animation by Okuruto Noboru and visual novel by Key. It was released in January 2021 for backers of the Planetarian: Snow Globe crowdfunding campaign who pledged at least ￥13,640 bearing the catalog number KAXA-9935CD. The soundtrack is composed, arranged, and produced by Shinji Orito, Donmaru and Ryō Mizutsuki. "Snow Globe" is sung by Riko Azuna, "Twinkle Starlight (Hoshino Yumemi Ver.)" is sung by Keiko Suzuki, and "Star trip" is sung by Sayaka Sasaki.

Singles

Twinkle Starlight / Worlds Pain
"Twinkle Starlight / Worlds Pain" is a single for the Planetarian original net animation series  by David Production, which was released on July 27, 2016, in Japan by Key Sounds Label bearing the catalog number KSLA-0117. "Twinkle Starlight" is sung by Sayaka Sasaki and "Worlds Pain" is sung by Ceui. The single is composed, arranged, and produced by Donmaru, Tomohiro Takeshita and Shōji Morifuji.

Hoshi no Fune / Gentle Jena
 / Gentle Jena" is a single for the Planetarian: Storyteller of the Stars film by David Production, which was released on September 21, 2016, in Japan by Key Sounds Label bearing the catalog number KSLA-0119. "Hoshi no Fune" is sung by Lia and "Gentle Jena" is sung by Ayaka Kitazawa. The single is composed, arranged, and produced by Shinji Orito, Magome Togoshi, Takayuki Negishi and Shōji Morifuji.

Chart positions

References

Anime soundtracks
Discographies of Japanese artists
Key Sounds Label
Video game music discographies